Parodia schumanniana is a quite rare species of succulent plant in the family Cactaceae. The specific epithet schumanniana honors the cactus specialist Karl Moritz Schumann.

Description
Parodia schumanniana  is a perennial globular to columnar plant with a diameter of about 30 cm and a height up to 1.8 meters.  The 21-48 well-marked ribs are straight and sharp. The bristle-like, straight to slightly curved spines are initially golden yellow, turning to brown or red and gray later. The one to three central spines, which can sometimes also be absent, are 1 to 3 inches long. The flowers bloom in Summer. They are lemon-yellow to golden yellow, with a diameter of about 4.5 to 6.5 cm. The fruits are spherical to ovoid, covered with dense wool and bristles and have diameters up to 1.5 centimeters. They contains reddish-brown to almost black seeds, which are nearly smooth and 1 to 1.2 millimeters long.

Distribution
This species is distributed in southern Brazil, southern Paraguay and northeastern Argentina. It prefers rocky slopes.

Subspecies
Parodia schumanniana subsp. schumanniana
Parodia schumanniana subsp. claviceps (F.Ritter) Hofacker & P.J.Braun

References

 Biolib
 Tropicos
 The plant list
 Desert-tropicals
 Urs Eggli, Leonard E. Newton: Etymological Dictionary of Succulent Plant Names. Springer, Berlin/Heidelberg 2010

schumanniana